Justice Vaughn may refer to:

James T. Vaughn Jr., associate justice of the Delaware Supreme Court
Earl W. Vaughn, associate justice of the North Carolina Supreme Court